Hassan Ali Allouba (died 3 January 1959) was an Egyptian footballer. He competed in the men's tournament at the 1920 Summer Olympics.

References

External links
 

Year of birth missing
1959 deaths
Egyptian footballers
Egypt international footballers
Olympic footballers of Egypt
Footballers at the 1920 Summer Olympics
Association football forwards
Tersana SC players